General Tiéfing Konaté (born 1954) is a Malian politician and soldier. He has been the Minister of Internal Security and Civilian Protection of Mali since 24 April 2012. He is a graduate of the Joint Military Academy in Kati. Between 1993 and 1994, he was in charge of the Presidency of the Republic and then Chief of Staff of the National Gendarmerie between 1994 and 2000. He then served as technical adviser to the Ministry of Internal Security and Protection Civilian between 2000 and 2008, before being appointed director of the National Gendarmerie, a position he held between 2008 and 2011. He also served as the Ambassador of Mali to Russia since June 2016.

References

Government ministers of Mali
Living people
1954 births
21st-century Malian people